In molecular biology, glycoside hydrolase family 65 is a family of glycoside hydrolases.

Glycoside hydrolases  are a widespread group of enzymes that hydrolyse the glycosidic bond between two or more carbohydrates, or between a carbohydrate and a non-carbohydrate moiety. A classification system for glycoside hydrolases, based on sequence similarity, has led to the definition of >100 different families. This classification is available on the CAZy web site, and also discussed at CAZypedia, an online encyclopedia of carbohydrate active enzymes.

This family of glycosyl hydrolases (CAZY GH_65) includes vacuolar acid trehalase and maltose phosphorylases. Maltose phosphorylase (MP) is a dimeric enzyme that catalyzes the conversion of maltose and inorganic phosphate into beta-D-glucose-1-phosphate and glucose.

It consists of three structural domains. The C-terminal domain forms a two layered jelly roll motif. This domain is situated at the base of the catalytic domain, however its function remains unknown. The central domain is the catalytic domain, which binds a phosphate ion that is proximal the highly conserved Glu. The arrangement of the phosphate and the glutamate is thought to cause nucleophilic attack on the anomeric carbon atom. The catalytic domain also forms the majority of the dimerisation interface. The N-terminal domain is believed to be essential for catalytic activity although its precise function remains unknown.

References

EC 3.2.1
GH family
Protein families